Langhorne Speedway was an automobile racetrack in Middletown Township, Bucks County, near the borough of Langhorne, Pennsylvania, a northern suburb of Philadelphia.

According to the book Langhorne! No Man's Land by L. Spencer Riggs: "With all other courses up to that time being fairground horse tracks, Langhorne was the first [one-]mile dirt track built specifically for cars". High-profile American racing clubs like the American Motorcyclist Association (AMA), American Automobile Association (AAA), and United States Auto Club (USAC) made Langhorne one of the stops on their national circuits. These events included AMA-sanctioned National Championship Motorcycle races between 1935 and 1956, AAA-sanctioned Championship Car races between 1930 and 1955, and USAC-sanctioned Championship Car races from 1956 to 1970. The USAC races featured (and were won by) notable racers such as A. J. Foyt, Mario Andretti, Al Unser, Bobby Unser, Gordon Johncock, Lloyd Ruby, and Eddie Sachs. Langhorne was also featured prominently in NASCAR's early years, and hosted at least one NASCAR-sanctioned race every year from 1949 to 1957.

Track history
The speedway was built by a group of Philadelphia racing enthusiasts known as the National Motor Racing Association (NMRA) and the first race was held on June 12, 1926 (scheduled for May 31 but postponed by rain). Freddie Winnai of Philadelphia qualified in 42.40 seconds, a new world record for a one-mile (1.6 km) track, and went on to win the 50-lap main event.

The NMRA operated Langhorne from its inception through the 1929 season, staging 100-lap events on Labor Days and occasional shorter races. Difficulties in track preparation, management disputes, and poor attendance drove the speedway to the brink of bankruptcy until noted promoter Ralph "Pappy" Hankinson took over in 1930. Hankinson brought in AAA Championship 100-lap races and continued to stage shorter sprint car racing events on the circular track.  One of the first stock car races in the northeastern U.S. was held at Langhorne in 1940; Roy Hall of Atlanta, Georgia, was the victor in the 200-lap event.

In 1941, Hankinson sold the track to stuntman Earl "Lucky" Teter after a falling out with the AAA. However, Teter's tenure only lasted until July 5, 1942, when he was killed while attempting his rocket car leap stunt at the Indiana State Fairgrounds. That same month, the U.S. government banned all forms of auto racing due to America's involvement in World War II. As a result, the speedway sat idle and did not host a race of any kind until 1946. Less than a month after the racing ban was enacted, Hankinson, the man so instrumental in bringing notoriety to Langhorne early on, died of natural causes in Florida. With a huge void created in the track's management, ownership of Langhorne Speedway was passed on to John Babcock and his family.  Then in 1951, Irv Fried and Al Gerber became promoters.

Catering chiefly to USAC's Championship Car Division, Fried and Gerber had the track's layout reconfigured to a D shape in 1965 by building a straightaway across the back stretch and paving over the uneven dirt surface with asphalt.  However, as suburban growth engulfed the speedway with Levittown being built up around the area, the offers from developers became too tempting to refuse.  Fried and Gerber announced the sale of the property to mall developers in 1967, but the speedway held on through five more seasons. The final race held at Langhorne occurred on October 17, 1971, with Roger Treichler claiming the win at the national open for modified stock cars.

Site after closure
The landscape of the once-famous racetrack was dramatically altered after that last race over 50 years ago. Almost immediately after Langhorne's closure, the property was razed in order to make way for a new shopping development. The current space features a Sam's Club, a Restaurant Depot warehouse and a CarMax dealership where the pits and grandstand were once located. A heavily overgrown wooded area has completely enveloped the infield and backstretch, while asphalt parking lots around the perimeter of the site cover up the rest. As a result, no physical remnants of the track itself remain.

On Saturday, October 14, 2006, almost 35 years to the day of the last race held at Langhorne, the Pennsylvania Historical and Museum Commission dedicated a historical marker at 1939 E. Lincoln Highway (in the same general area where the track was located) which reads:
     

Langhorne was relocated to southern New Jersey and became Bridgeport Speedway in Bridgeport, New Jersey.

Deaths and serious injuries
The track became known as one of the more dangerous tracks in motorsports. 18 drivers, five motorcycle riders, three spectators, and one flagman have died at the track. Larry Mann, Frank Arford, Bobby Marvin, John McVitty, Joe Russo, Mike Nazaruk, and Jimmy Bryan were all killed racing at this track.  In the first national open, in 1951, a large wreck blocked the track and burned driver Wally Campbell, that year's NASCAR National Modified champion. Several other noted drivers were injured in accidents, often described as spectacular, due to high speeds on the mile-long but rough dirt surface.

In 1965, one of the most spectacular comebacks in auto racing history began with the serious burns and injuries to Mel Kenyon. Kenyon  later returned to racing and placed third at the Indy 500 and won numerous national midget racing championships.

"Puke Hollow"
Probably the most notorious area of the original dirt race course, which earned the nickname "Puke Hollow", was located at turn two. It received this moniker due to the fact that a driver might be inclined to "puke" as a result of the extreme jostling his car would experience when hitting the deep ruts which formed in this section of the track as a race progressed. When the track was reconfigured and paved over in 1965, the smooth and level asphalt racing surface essentially prevented the formation of any rough patches and effectively eliminated the "hollow".

Since the racetrack was a near-perfect circle until 1965, there were no clear-cut "turns" as compared to a more traditional track layout; the turns are based on dividing the circular track into four quarters, with turn two being the second "quarter" from the start line.

Race history

Langhorne in NASCAR's pioneering years
The Speedway hosted the nation's most noted race for the Modified division; the first post-war stock car race run at the facility was a National Championship Stock Car Circuit (a forerunner to NASCAR) race in 1947, with Bob Flock taking home the checkered flag. In September 1949, Langhorne hosted the fourth race of NASCAR's first year of sanctioning unmodified cars, then called Strictly Stock; Curtis Turner won that race. The Strictly Stock series was renamed the Grand National series for the 1950 season, and the series is now known as NASCAR Cup Series. Langhorne continued to host an annual stop on the Grand National schedule from 1950 to 1957. Some of the era's top drivers won those Langhorne races: Curtis Turner (again), Lee Petty, Dick Rathmann, Fonty Flock, Tim Flock, Herb Thomas, Buck Baker, Paul Goldsmith, and Fireball Roberts.

NASCAR Grand National winners
All winners were  American

Langhorne National Open

From 1951 to 1971, Langhorne Speedway hosted the Langhorne National Open, which became the nation's most prestigious race for Sportsman and Modified cars.  Guaranteed starting positions were awarded to the winners (or highest finishers not already qualified) at special Langhorne Qualifier races held at weekly racetracks throughout the Northeast and Southeast.  It was common to have over a hundred cars attempt to qualify for the National Open.  From 1951 to 1957, the race was sanctioned by NASCAR.  In 1961 and 1962, Supermodifieds raced with the Modifieds and Sportsman cars.  Dutch Hoag was the most successful driver, winning five times.  Hoag was the only driver to win the National Open on both the dirt and pavement surfaces.

The National Open since 1972 has become the Race of Champions Modified race, raced exclusively on pavement and at various Northeastern tracks, and its history has been combined into the National Open.  Pavement Modified star Matt Hirschman won five of the past six editions since 2012, and has tied Hoag for most wins in this race's combined history.

Langhorne National Open winners
All winners were  American

(*) = Last race ever held at Langhorne Speedway.  See Race of Champions for a history of this race since 1972.

AAA Champ Car winners
All winners were  American

USAC Champ Car winners
All winners were  American

AMA 100 Mile National Speedway winners

References: American Motorcycle Association Archives; Jack Vanino, motorcycle historian

References

Buildings and structures in Bucks County, Pennsylvania
NASCAR tracks
Sports venues in Pennsylvania
1926 establishments in Pennsylvania
1971 disestablishments in Pennsylvania
Defunct motorsport venues in the United States